Nyala Stadium is a multi-use stadium in Addis Ababa, Ethiopia.  It is used mostly for football matches and serves as the home stadium of Nyala.  The stadium has a capacity of 3,000 people.

Multi-purpose stadiums in Ethiopia
Football venues in Addis Ababa